The IMRO – Bulgarian National Movement (IMRO–BNM; , VMRO–BND) is a national conservative political party in Bulgaria led by Krasimir Karakachanov. It claims to be the successor to the historic Internal Macedonian Revolutionary Organization.

History
The abbreviation IMRO refers to the Internal Macedonian Revolutionary Organization, a historic Bulgarian-led revolutionary political organization in the Macedonia and Thrace regions of the Ottoman Empire, founded in the late 19th century. At the time of its establishment in 1991, the name of the organization was IMRO-Union of Macedonian Associations. At the Fourth Congress in 1997, IMRO-UMA dropped the addition UMA. Initially, it was not involved in Bulgarian politics, but after 1994 it became politically active and entered the Bulgarian parliament. Renamed the IMRO-Bulgarian National Movement in 1998, the organization was gradually transformed into a right-wing populist political party in the 2000s. In 2010, a group of its members split from the party and formed National Ideal for Unity.

In the 2014 European Parliament election, the party was part of the "Bulgaria Without Censorship", which included the parties Bulgaria Without Censorship, IMRO-BNM, People's Agricultural Union, and George's Day Movement. The coalition received 10.66% of the votes and won two seats in the European Parliament. MEPs elected from the coalition include IMRO vice-leader Angel Djambazki and BBT leader Nikolay Barekov.

On 3 August 2014 a coalition agreement between the NFSB and IMRO called Patriotic Front was signed for the upcoming parliamentary elections 2014. And states its purpose to be for: "a revival of the Bulgarian economy, a fight against monopolies, achieving modern education and healthcare and a fair and uncorrupt judiciary." The signing of a coalition agreement between IMRO and NFSB marks the end of the BBT-IMRO coalition.

The members of the alliance are: PROUD, National Ideal for Unity, Middle European Class, Association Patriot, Undivided Bulgaria, National Movement BG Patriot, Union of the Patriotic Forces "Defense", National Association of Alternate Soldiery "For the Honor of epaulette", National Movement for the Salvation of the Fatherland and National Democratic Party.

Ahead of the second 2021 Bulgarian parliamentary election, Volya Movement formed an electoral alliance with the National Front for the Salvation of Bulgaria and the IMRO – Bulgarian National Movement. The party announced that it would not be participating in the 2023 Bulgarian parliamentary election, expecting that the elections would yield a similar result to the ones before, and accusing other parties of driving Bulgaria into an economic and political crisis, instead the party called on its supporters to boycott the elections.

Ideology

Identity 
The IMRO describes itself as a conservative and patriotic party based on modern nationalism. It defines itself as a "pan-Bulgarian national movement" aiming at "spiritual unity of the Bulgarian nation". It is known as a strongly nationalist and Orthodox Christian party which claims to continue the mission of the historic IMRO and strives for the recognition of the Bulgarian character of the majority population of the Republic of North Macedonia.

Social issues 
The IMRO is staunchly socially conservative and adamantly opposes same-sex marriage, even going as far as to propose additional amendments to Bulgaria's constitution to preemptively block any gay marriage law from being passed in the future.

During the 2020–2021 Bulgarian protests, the IMRO attempted to put the topic of gender (through the anti-LGBT trope of gender ideology) at the forefront over the COVID-19 pandemic in Bulgaria and the protests themselves in an attempt to increase its political legitimacy. Reporter Milana Nikolova wrote that gender "took a new meaning in the Bulgarian vernacular and overnight became a slur aimed at non-binary, gender-nonconforming, or at times even any person perceived to be LGBT+." Party leaders have also expressed the opinion that the protests were organized by "a few Sorosoidite NGOs and extra-parliamentary political parties hungry for power", claiming that the goal of the protests, in his view, was to "bring about gay marriage" and "create a gender republic", which they entirely disagreed with. Similarly, it also proposed constitutional amendments that would ban people without a certain level of academic qualifications from voting in elections or referendums, as well as amendments that would bring back mandatory conscription for all males.

Minorities 
The IMRO expresses an antiziganist worldview, proposing a "solution to the problem of unsocialized gypsie groups", which included a destruction of Romani ghettoes, penal labour, restriction of social benefits and limiting births among younger Romani. Likewise, it is critical of Bulgarian Turks and unwelcoming of Islam in Bulgaria, calling on the government to "stop the sounds of terror coming from minarets".

Foreign policy 
The IMRO supports Bulgarian membership of NATO. It believes Bulgaria should have a place within the European Union but calls for a fundamental change of direction and a "conservative wave" within the EU and argues against "Liberal utopia" ideas that dominate the EU, which the party cites as gender ideology, mass migration and "colonial neoliberalism." The party also opposes the accession of Turkey to the European Union and wants to reform or end many of the EU's migration policies to "prevent Brussels from committing suicide in Europe." The IMRO states that Bulgaria should see international alliances as "civilizational" and a means of protecting Western Christian identity, solidarity in Europe and promoting Bulgarian interests. Although the party condemned the 2022 Russian invasion of Ukraine, Karakachanov has criticised military aid to Ukraine, expressing his belief that there was not a military solution to the conflict.

Election results

National Assembly

European Parliament

See also 
 The National Youth Committee of IMRO – Bulgarian National Movement

References

External links
 Official website

External links

Nationalist parties in Bulgaria
Conservative parties in Bulgaria
Eurosceptic parties in Bulgaria
European Conservatives and Reformists member parties
Right-wing populism in Bulgaria
1991 establishments in Bulgaria
Organizations established in 1991
Bulgarian National Movement
Eastern Orthodox political parties
National conservative parties
Right-wing populist parties
Far-right parties in Europe